Antonín Brož (born December 14, 1987 in Jablonec nad Nisou) is a Czech luger who has competed since 2002. He finished 16th in the men's doubles event at the 2006 Winter Olympics in Turin.

Brož finish 19th in the men's doubles event at the 2007 FIL World Luge Championships in Igls.

He competes in doubles with his brother Lukáš.

References
 2006 luge men's doubles results

External links 
 
 
 

1987 births
Living people
Czech male lugers
Olympic lugers of the Czech Republic
Lugers at the 2006 Winter Olympics
Lugers at the 2014 Winter Olympics
Lugers at the 2018 Winter Olympics
Sportspeople from Jablonec nad Nisou